Big Crab Orchard Site is a historic archaeological site located near Tazewell, Tazewell County, Virginia. The Crab Orchard site was patented in 1750, and was one of the first European settlements in Southwest Virginia. Parts of the tract were later owned by Morris Griffith and William Ingles and then acquired by Thomas Witten Sr., who settled here about 1768.

It was listed on the National Register of Historic Places in 1980.

References

External links
Historic Crab Orchard Museum

Archaeological sites on the National Register of Historic Places in Virginia
National Register of Historic Places in Tazewell County, Virginia